The 1991–92 National Professional Soccer League season was the eighth season for the league.

League Standings

American Division

National Division

Playoffs

League Leaders

Scoring

Goalkeeping

League awards
 Most Valuable Player: Jamie Swanner, Canton
 Defender of the Year: Matt Knowles, Illinois
 Rookie of the Year: Sean Bowers, Detroit
 Goalkeeper of the Year: Jamie Swanner, Canton
 Coach of the Year: Jim Pollihan, Harrisburg

All-NPSL Teams

All-Rookie Teams

External links
Major Indoor Soccer League II (RSSSF)
1992 in American Soccer

1991 in American soccer leagues
1992 in American soccer leagues
1991-92